Mut (transl. courage) is a German political party founded in June 2017 by Claudia Stamm and Stephan Lessenich.

History 
Since 2009, Stamm has been associated with the Greens as a Member of Parliament. She resigned in March 2017 and formed Mut on 1 June 2017 with Lessenich and others. Mut is a federal party and is based in Munich. Apart from Stamm and Lessenich, the board members include Nicole Britz and Alex Schweiger, the treasurer. Britz is the former Chairman of the Pirate Party of Bavaria.

Other known members of the political party are Renate Ackermann and Matthias Matuschik.

It is the youngest political party to participate in the Bavarian state elections of 2018. Initially, the party had problems finding eligible candidates to contest in the election but they fulfilled the requirement. Among 44 out of 91 constituencies, Mut party had direct candidates.

References

2017 establishments in Germany
Liberal parties in Germany
Political parties established in 2017
Green political parties in Germany
Social liberal parties